is a passenger railway station  located in Kita-ku Kobe, Hyōgo Prefecture, Japan. It is operated by the private transportation company, Kobe Electric Railway (Shintetsu).

Lines

Station layout
The station consists of one side platform serving a single bidirectional track. The station building is elevated and is located on the edge of a hill, with a residential area on the west side and a bus stop on the hill directly accessed by stairs from the station building. In anticipation of double-tracking, the platform is designed so that it can be remodeled into an island-type platform with two tracks in the future.

Adjacent stations

History
On 18 December 1928, in tandem with the opening of the Sanda Line,  was opened. It was renamed to its present name of 20 October 1991.

Passenger statistics
In fiscal 2019, the station was used by an average of 1,963 passengers daily

Surrounding area
Japan National Route 176 
Kobe Municipal Kita-Kobe Junior High School

See also
List of railway stations in Japan

References

External links 

 Official home page 

Railway stations in Kobe
Railway stations in Japan opened in 1928